Wendy Alec is a British writer, TV producer, film-maker, and a director of WarBoys Entertainment London. She has written seven books, including the epic fantasy series, Chronicles of Brothers. She co-founded the GOD TV network in 1995 and presided as Director of Television and Creative Director for 21 years.

Early life and career 

Alec was born in London, UK. After leaving school, she trained further in speech, drama, and music. She began her career in advertising in the early 1990s, first as a copywriter and then as a creative director. Alec was trained in screenwriting by her mentor in Hollywood, screen doctor Ron Suppa, professor at UCLA's Extension Screenwriting Programme.

God TV 

Alec co-founded GOD TV with Rory Alec in 1995 as the UK and Europe's first daily Christian television network – broadcasting two hours a day on Rupert Murdoch's SKY platform. The network grew rapidly over the past 21 years, now with a broadcast reach of 951 million viewers.

Over the past two decades Alec has worked as GOD TV's Creative Director and Director of Television responsible for the network's international branding and programming line-up. She has also been the network's president. Alec is the host of Word From The Heart  and An Evening With Wendy on GOD TV.

Alec has represented GOD TV at several international conferences including: the Women on the Frontlines World Convention 2015 at Angelus Temple in Los Angeles and the Empowered21 Jerusalem 2015 Global Congress.

Alec and her husband divorced in 2014.

Book publications 

Alec published the first book in her Chronicles of Brothers series, The Fall of Lucifer, in January 2006. She published the second book, Messiah—The First Judgement in November 2007, Son of Perdition in December 2009, and A Pale Horse in December 2012. With nearly a million books sold, Alec has now  turned her hand to screenwriting, already having completed the first screenplay, The Fall of Lucifer, and currently developing Chronicles into a TV series in the genre of 'Game of Thrones'.

Alec published an autobiography, Against All Odds, in 2001. She is also the author of 'Journal of the Unknown Prophet', which is presented as a prophetic revelation given to her by God.  Visions From Heaven – Visitations To My Father's Chamber is Alec's second best selling 'prophetic' journal. She has completed Book Five of the Chronicles Series 'End Of Days' which was published by HarperCollins in Autumn 2018.

Awards 

Alec has been recognised for her work at In the media arena with a Global Platinum Award from the Global Media Summit in 2016.

She has also received awards from the Christian Broadcasting Council of the UK for her work on projects including The Global Day of Prayer Live. and Gold awards for 'Best Ministry TV Program' and 'Best Music TV Programme'. Underneath her leadership at GOD TV as Director of Television, her production teams won over 20 Angel Awards.

Alec has also received awards for her writing. She received an 'Outstanding Contribution to Literature Award' for Chronicles of Brothers and the Journal of the Unknown Prophet, all four of Chronicles won the Best Fiction Award at Eden( the UKs largest online Christian Bookstore) and Wendy Alec also received the award for 'Outstanding Fiction Writer' for Chronicles of Brothers in the Exceptional Writers Awards.

References

External links 
– Wendy Alec's Chronicles of Brothers – The Official Site
– Journal of the Unknown Prophet Official Site
GOD TV Official site

British writers
Living people
Year of birth missing (living people)
Women science fiction and fantasy writers
Christian novelists